The 2021 Okolo Slovenska was the 65th edition of the Okolo Slovenska road cycling stage race. It was held from 15 and 19 September 2021, as a category 2.1 event on the 2021 UCI Europe Tour.

Teams 
Seven of the nineteen UCI WorldTeams, five UCI ProTeams, eight UCI Continental teams, and the Slovakian national team made up the twenty-one teams that participated in the race. All but two teams entered a full squad of seven riders:  entered six, while  entered five. In total, 144 riders started the race, of which 105 finished.

UCI WorldTeams

 
 
 
 
 
 
 

UCI ProTeams

 
 
 
 
 

UCI Continental Teams

 
 
 
 
 
 
 
 

National Teams

 Slovakia

Route

Stages

Prologue 
15 September 2021 — Košice,  (ITT)

Stage 1 
16 September 2021 — Košice to Košice,

Stage 2 
17 September 2021 — Spišské Podhradie to Dolný Kubín,

Stage 3 
18 September 2021 — Dolný Kubín to Považská Bystrica,

Stage 4 
19 September 2021 — Trenčianske Teplice to Trnava,

Classification leadership table 

 For stage 1, per the race regulations, Jannik Steimle, the second-placed rider after the prologue, was assigned the green jersey of the leader of the points classification, and Marceli Bogusławski, the third-placed rider after the prologue, was assigned the polka-dot jersey of the leader of the mountains classification. However, neither rider was deemed to be officially leading those respective classifications, as no points were awarded in the prologue for either classification.
 On stage 2, Leon Heinschke, who was second in the young rider classification, wore the white jersey, because first-placed Eirik Lunder wore the green jersey as the leader of the points classification.
 On stage 3, Peter Sagan, who was second in the points classification, wore the green jersey, because first-placed Álvaro Hodeg wore the yellow jersey as the leader of the general classification. On stage 4, Hodeg wore the green jersey, having switched positions with Sagan in both the general and the points classifications; Sagan wore the yellow jersey.

Final classification standings

General classification

Points classification

Mountains classification

Young rider classification

Slovakian rider classification

Team classification

Notes

References

External links 
  

2021
Okolo Slovenska
Okolo Slovenska
Okolo Slovenska